Wojciech Trojanowski (25 September 1904 – 16 June 1988) was a Polish hurdler. He competed in the men's 110 metres hurdles at the 1928 Summer Olympics.

References

1904 births
1988 deaths
Athletes (track and field) at the 1928 Summer Olympics
Polish male hurdlers
Olympic athletes of Poland
Sportspeople from Kraków
20th-century Polish people